Heritage Farmstead Museum (also known as the Ammie Wilson House) is a historic farm museum at 1900 West 15th Street in Plano, Texas.

The late-Victorian farm-house was built in 1891 on a 365-acre farm belonging to Mary Alice Farrell and her husband Hunter Farrell, a landowner and businessman whose family had moved to Texas from Virginia.  The Farrells divorced in 1929 and eventually their daughter Ammie took over management of the farm and became an award-winning livestock breeder before her death in 1972.  The farm was added to the National Register of Historic Places in 1978. In 1986 the farm opened as a living museum utilizing the remaining 4.5 acres surrounding the home. The museum is accredited by the American Alliance of Museums.

See also

National Register of Historic Places listings in Collin County, Texas
Recorded Texas Historic Landmarks in Collin County

References

External links

Heritage Farmstead Museum

Houses on the National Register of Historic Places in Texas
Victorian architecture in Texas
Houses completed in 1891
Institutions accredited by the American Alliance of Museums
Farm museums in Texas
Museums in Collin County, Texas
Buildings and structures in Plano, Texas
Museums established in 1986
1986 establishments in Texas
Houses in Collin County, Texas
Farms on the National Register of Historic Places in Texas
National Register of Historic Places in Collin County, Texas
Recorded Texas Historic Landmarks